Molesey Lock is a lock on the River Thames in England at East Molesey, Surrey on the right bank.

The lock was built by the City of London Corporation in 1815 and was rebuilt by the Thames Conservancy in 1906. Upstream of the lock are moorings for small boats, specifically skiff, paddleboard, small speedboat and open kayak hire, a tour boat pier, a kiosk and van parking space for ice cream and soft drinks. A few metres upstream is a combined side weir and front weir followed by an attached ait, Ash Island. A low backwater against the opposite bank which forms the waterside to homes sometimes called the Hampton Riviera  continues to a small upper weir.

Molesey Lock is within sight of the walls of Hampton Court Palace in southwest London on the opposite bank through the arches of Hampton Court Bridge, designed by Edwin Lutyens (220 m away).

Boat hire and touring
The lock's proximity to Hampton Court and boat hire at the site made it a popular venue for spectators in the Victorian and Edwardian eras, the tree-lined lock attracts large numbers of visitors for nine months of the year. Hire boat companies and ice cream sales attract visitors in all months apart from winter.

History
A lock was first proposed in 1802 because of then-shallows upstream at "Kenton Hedge and Sundbury Flatts above" — nothing came of the suggestion. In 1809 the proposal was resubmitted Parliament passed the Act for construction of the lock in 1812. Building began in 1814 and it opened in 1815 with an Italianate lockhouse. The first lock keeper was killed in a horse race at Moulsey Hurst and his successor discharged after incidents of stealing from barges. In 1853 changes were made to the lock in anticipation of lower water levels caused by the extraction of water upstream. Fish ladders were added to the weir in 1864 and the boat slide built in 1871.  Such was the popularity of boating that in 1877 the navigation commission stationed a boat and crew in busy days above the weir in case of accidents.  The lock was rebuilt in 1906. On the small lock island is a plaque commemorating Michael J Bulleid whose work for salmon conservancy allows them to scale the river.

Access to the lock

Reach above the lock

After the lock cut is Tagg's Island which provides mooring for houseboats some of which are three storeys high. On the Surrey bank here is the "Eights Tree" a tall metal sculpture outside Molesey Boat Club. The left bank here is sometimes marked as the Hampton Riviera featuring the Swiss Cottage, the Astoria Houseboat and an array of period buildings at Hampton such as Rotary Court. Garrick's Ait similar in size to Ash Island, is residential, by the Hampton-Molesey Hurst Ferry, which runs in the summer between Hampton and Moulsey Hurst park on the right bank.

Left bank proceeding in reverse to flow
Facing Hampton's church, a large pub across the A308 road The Bell and various brick-built cottages forming the original village conservation area of Hampton is Benn's Island, the second-smallest named island in the Thames. It is covered by Hampton Sailing Club's building and raised pontoons. Upstream is Platts Eyot, where Motor Torpedo Boats were built during World War II. At Platt's Eyot on the left bank is Hampton Water Treatment Works and reservoirs set behind a minor road to Shepperton and the Hampton School Boat Club Millennium boat house. Grand Junction Isle has a footbridge and a few chalets on it followed by riverside houses at Sunbury and Sunbury Court Island. Upstream of these is Rivermead Island an expanse of public open space. The area of Sunbury Weir pool is used for kayaking and the narrow Creek backwater runs on the left bank adjoining Wheatley's Ait which has two sources: the River Ash and a minor tumbling bay-weir fed branch of the Thames which naturally formed the large residential island.

Right bank proceeding in reverse to flow
On the right bank is the large stretch of open ground at Moulsey Hurst, which has a heritage marker and an information panel opposite Platt's Eyot. Beyond the Eyot on this bank are the Molesey Reservoirs behind the towpath to Walton-on-Thames, trees, high brick walls and a patch of meadow before Sunbury Lock.

Sports and public regattas
The stretch is home to two sailing and three rowing clubs, one of which is skiffing and one for two large independent schools. Molesey Regatta takes place from Platts Eyot in July and Sunbury Amateur Regatta is held alongside Rivermead Island in August.

Sports clubs on the reach

Molesey Boat Club 
Hampton School Boat Club (shares Millennium Boathouse with LEH School) 
 Sunbury Skiff and Punting Club 
 Lady Eleanor Holles School Boat Club (shares Millennium Boathouse with Hampton School)
 Hampton Sailing Club
 Aquarius Sailing Club
 Hampton Canoe Club
 1st Molesey (Jaguar) Sea Scout Group
 1st Hampton Hill (Achilles) Sea Scout Group

Waterworks and reservoirs

There are reservoirs on both sides of the river above Sunbury Lock, created after the 1852 Metropolis Water Act made it illegal to take drinking water for London from the tidal Thames below Teddington Lock because of the amount of sewage in the river. The Hampton Waterworks were built on the northern bank in the 1850s by three companies — the Grand Junction Waterworks Company, the Southwark and Vauxhall Waterworks Company, and the West Middlesex Waterworks Company. The reservoirs at Molesey on the southern bank were established in 1872, by the Lambeth Waterworks Company, followed three years later by the Chelsea Waterworks Company. Both companies had previously built their reservoirs at Seething Wells below Molesey Lock, but the turbulence caused by the River Mole, River Ember and The Rythe meant there was too much mud brought in with the water.

Thames Path

The Thames Path stays on the Surrey bank (right bank) to Sunbury Lock. The next bridge is half-way along the long reach upstream, Walton Bridge.  A large tank trap from World War II is visible beside the right-bank reservoirs.

Literature and the Media

 Jerome K. Jerome wrote in the 1880s "I have stood and watched it sometimes when you could not see any water at all, but only a brilliant triangle of bright blazers and gay caps, and saucy hats, and many-coloured parasols, and silken rugs and cloaks and streaming ribbons..."
 The lock featured in an edition of the gardening make-over programme Ground Force

See also 

 Locks on the River Thames
 Rowing on the River Thames
 Sailing on the River Thames
 London water supply infrastructure

References

External links 

 Photographs of Molesey Lock from the Francis Frith Collection
 Memoryscape — Drifting: Molesey Lock
 1st Molesey (Jaguar) Sea Scout Group

Locks on the River Thames
1815 establishments in England
Geography of Surrey
Transport in Surrey